The M5 is a motorway in England linking the Midlands with the South West. It runs from junction 8 of the M6 at West Bromwich near Birmingham to Exeter in Devon. Heading south-west, the M5 runs east of West Bromwich and west of Birmingham through Sandwell Valley. It continues past Bromsgrove (and from Birmingham and Bromsgrove is part of the Birmingham Motorway Box), Droitwich Spa, Worcester, Tewkesbury, Cheltenham, Gloucester, Bristol, Clevedon, Weston-super-Mare, Bridgwater, Taunton, terminating at junction 31 for Exeter. Congestion on the section south of the M4 is common during the summer holidays, on Friday afternoons and bank holidays.

Route

The M5 quite closely follows the route of the A38 road. The two deviate slightly around Bristol and the area south of Bristol from junctions 16 to the Sedgemoor services north of junction 22. The A38 goes straight through the centre of Bristol and passes by Bristol Airport, while the M5 skirts both, with access to the airport from junctions 18, 19 or 22. The A38 continues south into Devon from junction 31, near Exminster. 

Junction 15 of the M5 is a large four-level stack interchange, named the Almondsbury Interchange, where the M5 meets the M4. 
The Avonmouth Bridge, between junctions 18 and 19, is often a bottleneck during heavy traffic periods, due mainly to lane drops at either end of the bridge for the respective junctions, and the sharp angle in the centre of the bridge, which causes larger vehicles to slow considerably.  There are split-level carriageways where the M5 ascends the hillsides above the Gordano Valley, between Portishead, junction 19 and Clevedon, junction 20.
Between junction 21, Weston-super-Mare and junction 22, Burnham-on-Sea, the M5 passes by an isolated landmark hill called Brent Knoll. The Willow Man sculpture is visible from both carriageways, and acts as a landmark just to the south of junction 23, which  had degraded and lost its head and arms.

History

Construction
The first  of the M5 motorway was constructed as a dual two-lane motorway with Worcestershire County Council acting as engineer.  This sectionfrom junction 4 (Lydiate Ash) in the north to a trumpet junction with the M50 in the southopened in July 1962. This original section of the M5, from junctions 4 to 8, was widened to provide six lanes in the early 1990s. During this work, the northbound Strensham services were rebuilt further away from the modified M50 junction.

Worcestershire County Council, the police and particularly the county surveyor of Worcestershire made repeated representations that a dual three-lane standard motorway was appropriate. The Ministry of Transport insisted that a dual two-lane motorway would be built at a cost of around £8million. When the decision became necessary to widen the Worcestershire section of M5, it cost £123million.

The  dual two-lane section between junctions 16 and 17 built at Filton, near Bristol, was also opened in 1962, and was intended to replace the pre-war Filton bypass. Gloucestershire County Council acted as engineer for this section, which was widened to a dual three-lane motorway in 1969.

North of junction 4 the M5 was constructed in sections, from 1967 to 1970, together with the Frankley services. Much of the northern section beyond junction 3, from about Oldbury to the junction with the M6 motorway, was constructed as an elevated dual three-lane motorway over Birmingham Canal (Old Main Line), Birmingham Canal (New Main Line), and Titford Pool using concrete pillars.

The M5 was also extended southwards, in sections, from 1967 to 1977, through Gloucestershire and Somerset, to Exeter in Devon as a dual three-lane motorway, together with the Strensham services.

The short section between junctions 27 and 29 was built between 1967 and 1969, by Devon County Council, as the A38 Cullompton Bypass, with the intention that it should become part of the M5. The termini for this section have since been removed, although part of the southern terminal roundabout is now used as an emergency access. The section was developed to motorway standards, and incorporated into the M5 in 1975.

Operational history

Junction 1 surrounds a surviving gatehouse from the former Sandwell Hall.

In the late 1980s, junction 4a was built as part of the M42 motorway construction project. The route of the M42 was decided as early as 1972 but, owing to planning delays, the short section of the M42 north of Bromsgrove did not open until December 1989.

As the M5 traffic increased in the 1980s, junction 11, the main Gloucester and Cheltenham access (via the A40 Golden Valley by-pass) became increasingly congested. At the same time there were plans for large scale business and housing developments at Brockworth, near Gloucester. A further feature of this junction was to create a new route from the south west Midlands to London and central southern England via the A417, A419 and the M4 at junction 15. 

The Avonmouth Bridge was converted to eight lanes (four lanes in each direction) in the early 2000s. Later, in 2005–2006, parts of the M5 between junctions 17 and 20 were widened to 7 lanes (four lanes climbing the hills and three lanes descending the hills); variable message signs were added and parts of the central reservation was converted to a concrete step barrier. During this stage of construction the M5 became Britain's longest contraflow system,
spanning  between junctions 19 and 20. The M5 contraflow was said to be the most complicated ever built in the UK as the motorway is on a split level around the steep hills of the Gordano Valley; meaning four lanes plus an additional emergency vehicle lane were squeezed into that section.

In 2002, extended exits for junction 12 were constructed. The Highways Agency did not anticipate the traffic flows through the junction and the resultant queues soon extended back onto the motorway.

The Cullompton services are signed on the motorway in the northbound direction only. This was implemented to reduce congestion at the low capacity junction, although there is still access available to the services southbound through the junction. Also, the northbound exit slip to the junction was reduced to one lane instead of two to reduce traffic on the small roundabout at the west side of the junction.

In 2009, it was announced that the lighting between junctions 30 and 31 would be turned off between midnight and 5.00am to save energy.

Proposals were announced in September 2009 for a new Gloucester Services between junctions 11a and 12. A planning application was submitted in December 2009. Stroud District councillors approved the services in August 2010.  The Services opened in May 2014

Future developments
In 2020, it was announced that junction 10 would be undergoing significant roadworks as part of a redevelopment project on the A4019. The works will involve making the interchange full-access and dualling the A4019 east of the junction into Cheltenham. Works will commence in 2023 (subject to permission being granted) and be completed in 2024, according to the Gloucestershire County Council.

There have been suggestions that the Government extend the M5 south, to the city of Plymouth, which currently relies on the A38 road] The argument for such an extension has intensified in light of the closure of Plymouth City Airport in 2011, and the 2014 breaching of the South Devon Railway sea wall following storms that in turn, cut off Plymouth and Cornwall's rail access.

Improvements to junction 25 at Taunton were approved with an £18million programme that will include the enlargement of the junction roundabout, the widening of the eastern junction slip road exit, and an additional roundabout southeast of the junction to provide access to a new business park and to a proposed bypass of the hamlet of Henlade.

Incidents and events

Discovery of bones

In October 2009, workmen clearing vegetation from the slip road at junction 14 discovered human bones in a black bin bag dumped in the bushes. The police were called soon after, and it was soon established that the bones were those of a young female. A few days later, DNA found on the remains confirmed that the body was that of Melanie Hall, a Bath hospital worker who disappeared in June 1996 after a night out in Bath, and who had been declared dead in absentia in 2004. Dental records confirmed that the body was hers, and the police began a formal investigation into her murder. As of 2016 no one has been prosecuted in connection with this case. Some keys were also discovered and the police contacted Ford to help them trace the vehicle.

2011 multi-vehicle collision

On the evening of Friday 4 November 2011, seven people were killed and a further 51 injured in a major crash involving over 50 vehicles which included cars, vans and large goods vehicles near junction 25 in West Monkton, near Taunton. Several vehicles were burnt out in the fire which developed at the scene as the result of a series of explosions, and the road surface was seriously damaged, not just by the fire and explosions, but also by fuel spillage. The cause of the crash, which took place in wet foggy conditions close to a firework display, was investigated. One person was charged for breach under health and safety laws and found not guilty.

Junctions

Data from driver location signs are used to provide distance and carriageway identifier information. Where both the start and end point of the junction are known, both have been included.

{| style="margin-left:1em; margin-bottom:1em; color:black;" class="wikitable"
|-  style="background:#0079C1; text-align:center; color:white; font-size:120%;"
| colspan="6" | M5 motorway junctions
|-  style="background:#000; text-align:center; color:white;"
| mile
| km
| North-east bound exits (B carriageway)
| Junction
| South-west bound exits (A carriageway)
| Coordinates
|- style="text-align:center;"
|0.0
|0.0
| London (M1, M40), Birmingham (N&E), The North West, Walsall, Wolverhampton M6
| M6 J8
| Start of motorway
| 
|- style="text-align:center;"
|2.73.3
|4.3  5.3
| West Bromwich, Birmingham (NW) A41
| J1
| West Bromwich, Sandwell, Birmingham (NW) A41
| 
|- style="text-align:center;"
|5.25.8
|8.4  9.3
| Dudley, Wolverhampton, Sandwell A4123
|J2
| Birmingham (W), Dudley A4123
| 
|- style="text-align:center;"
|8.69.0
|13.8  14.5
| Birmingham (W&C) A456
|J3
| Kidderminster A456
| 
|- style="text-align:center;"
|
|
| style=background:skyblue | Entering West Midlands
|
| style=background:skyblue | Entering Worcestershire
| 
|- style="text-align:center;"
|
|
| Frankley services
| Services
| Frankley services
| 
|- style="text-align:center;"
|14.014.4
|22.5  23.2
| Birmingham (SW) A38, Stourbridge A491
|J4
| Birmingham (SW), Bromsgrove A38
| 
|- style="text-align:center;"
|16.1
|25.9
| End of variable speed limit 
|rowspan=2| J4A
| London (M40), National Exhibition Centre, Birmingham  M42
|rowspan=2| 
|- style="text-align:center;"
|16.6
|26.7
| The North East, National Exhibition Centre, Birmingham  M42
| Start of variable speed limit 
|- style="text-align:center;"
|21.421.7
|34.5  35.0
| Bromsgrove, Droitwich A38
|J5
| Droitwich A38
| 
|- style="text-align:center;"
| 27.027.5
| 43.5  44.2
| Worcester (N), Kidderminster A449
|rowspan=2| J6
| Worcester (N) A449, Evesham A4538
| rowspan=2| 
|- style="text-align:center;"
|
|
| Start of variable speed limit 
| End of variable speed limit 
|- style="text-align:center;"
|30.230.7
| 48.6  49.4
| Worcester (S), Evesham A44
|J7
| Worcester (S) A44
| 
|- style="text-align:center;"
|
|
|Strensham services (northbound)
|rowspan=2| Services
| No access
| 
|- style="text-align:center;"
|
|
| No access
|Strensham services (southbound)
| 
|- style="text-align:center;"
|39.7
|63.9
| style=background:skyblue | Entering Worcestershire
|rowspan=2| J8
| South Wales, Ross  M50
|rowspan=2| 
|- style="text-align:center;"
|40.0
|64.4
| South Wales, Ross  M50
| style=background:skyblue | Entering Gloucestershire
|- style="text-align:center;"
|
|
| style=background:skyblue | Entering Gloucestershire
| rowspan=2 |
| River Avon
|rowspan=2| 
|- style="text-align:center;"
|
|
| River Avon
| style=background:skyblue | Entering Worcestershire
|- style="text-align:center;"
|
|
| style=background:skyblue | Entering Worcestershire
|
| style=background:skyblue | Entering Gloucestershire
| 
|- style="text-align:center;"
|43.443.9
|69.8 70.6
| Tewkesbury A438, Evesham A46
|J9
| Evesham A46, Tewkesbury A438
| 
|- style="text-align:center;"
|48.348.5
|77.7  78.0
| No access (on-slip only)
|J10
| Cheltenham A4019
| 
|- style="text-align:center;"
|51.051.4
|82.1  82.8
| Gloucester, Cheltenham A40
|J11
| Cheltenham, Gloucester, Staverton  A40
| 
|- style="text-align:center;"
|53.454.0
|85.9  86.9
| Gloucester, Cirencester A417
|J11A
| London, Cirencester A417
| 
|- style="text-align:center;"
|
|
|Gloucester services
| Services
|Gloucester services
| 
|- style="text-align:center;"
|60.260.5
|96.9  97.4
| Gloucester (A38)
|J12
| Gloucester (A38)
| 
|- style="text-align:center;"
|63.363.7
|101.8  102.5
| Stroud A419
|J13
| Stroud, Dursley A419
| 
|- style="text-align:center;"
|71.9
|115.7
|Michaelwood services
| Services
|Michaelwood services
| 
|- style="text-align:center;"
|73.673.9
|118.4  119.0
| Dursley B4509
|J14
| Thornbury B4509
| 
|- style="text-align:center;"
|
|
| End of variable speed limit 
|rowspan=2| J15
| Start of variable speed limit 
|rowspan=2| 
|- style="text-align:center;"
|81.181.7
|130.5  131.5
| South Wales, Chepstow (M48) M4(W)London M4(E)
| London, Bristol (C) (M32) M4(E)South Wales, Chepstow (M48) M4(W)
|- style="text-align:center;"
|82.082.3
|132.0  132.5
| Thornbury, Filton A38
|J16
| Thornbury, Filton A38
| 
|- style="text-align:center;"
|84.284.6
|135.5136.2
| Bristol (W), Cribbs Causeway A4018
|rowspan=2| J17
| Bristol (W), Cribbs Causeway A4018
|rowspan=2| 
|- style="text-align:center;"
|
|
| Start of variable speed limit 
| End of variable speed limit 
|- style="text-align:center;"
|
|
| style=background:skyblue | Entering Gloucestershire
|
| style=background:skyblue | Entering Bristol
| 
|- style="text-align:center;"
|87.487.7
|140.6  141.2
| South Wales, Cardiff, Newport M49 (M4(W))
|J18A
| No access (on-slip only)
| 
|- style="text-align:center;"
|88.088.2
| 141.6  142.0
| Bristol, Bristol , Shirehampton, Avonmouth, Docks A4, Aust (A403)
|J18
| Avonmouth, Bristol (West), Bristol  A4
| 
|- style="text-align:center;"
| rowspan=2 |
| rowspan=2 |
| style=background:skyblue | Entering Bristol
| rowspan=2 |
| Avonmouth Bridge
| rowspan=2 | 
|- style="text-align:center;"
| Avonmouth Bridge
| style=background:skyblue | Entering Somerset
|- style="text-align:center;"
|90.1
|145.0
| Clifton (Toll), Portishead, Royal Portbury Dock  A369 Gordano services
|J19 Services
| Portishead, Royal Portbury Dock A369 Gordano services
| 
|- style="text-align:center;"
|96.7
|155.6
| Clevedon, Nailsea B3133
|J20
| Clevedon, Nailsea B3133
| 
|- style="text-align:center;"
|
|
| colspan=3 | Blind Yeo
| 
|- style="text-align:center;"
|102.3
|164.6
| Weston-super-Mare, Bristol (South) A370
|J21
| Weston-super-Mare A370
| 
|- style="text-align:center;"
|
|
| colspan=3 | River Axe
| 
|- style="text-align:center;"
|109.1
|175.6
|Sedgemoor services
|Services
|Sedgemoor services
| 
|- style="text-align:center;"
|111.7
|179.8
| Weston-super-Mare, Burnham-on-Sea, Bristol (South), Bristol  A38
|J22
| Highbridge, Burnham-on-Sea A38
| 
|- style="text-align:center;"
|
|
| colspan=3 | River Brue
| 
|- style="text-align:center;"
|
|
| colspan=3 | Huntspill River
| 
|- style="text-align:center;"
|116.9
|188.1
| Highbridge (A38), Glastonbury, Wells A39
|J23
| Bridgwater (A38), Minehead, Glastonbury, Wells A39
| 
|- style="text-align:center;"
|
|
| colspan=3 | King's Sedgemoor Drain
| 
|- style="text-align:center;"
|
|
| colspan=3 | River Parrett
| 
|- style="text-align:center;"
|121.8122.0
|196.0  196.3
| Bridgwater, Minehead A38Bridgwater services
|J24 Services
| Minehead (A39)Bridgwater services
| 
|- style="text-align:center;"
|
|
| colspan=3 | River Tone
| 
|- style="text-align:center;"
|128.4128.6
|206.7  206.9
| Taunton, Yeovil A358
|J25
| Taunton, Honiton, Yeovil, Weymouth A358
| 
|- style="text-align:center;"
|133.3
|214.5
|Taunton Deane services
|Services
|Taunton Deane services
| 
|- style="text-align:center;"
|135.3135.5
|217.8  218.0
| Wellington, Taunton A38
|J26
| Wellington A38
| 
|- style="text-align:center;"
|
|
| style=background:skyblue | Entering Somerset
|
| style=background:skyblue | Entering Devon
| 
|- style="text-align:center;"
|143.4143.7
|230.7  231.3
| Barnstaple, Tiverton A361, Wellington A38
|J27
| Tiverton, Barnstaple A361
| 
|- style="text-align:center;"
|147.6147.9
|237.5  238.0
| Cullompton B3181 Cullompton services
|J28 Services
|Honiton A373, Cullompton B3181
| 
|- style="text-align:center;"
|157.7158.1
|253.8  254.4
| Honiton, Exeter  A30
|J29
| Honiton A30 (East), Exeter 
| 
|- style="text-align:center;"
|158.9159.3
|255.7  256.3
| Exeter A379, Exmouth A376, Sidmouth (A3052)Exeter services
|J30 Services
| Dawlish, Exeter A379, Sidmouth, Exmouth A376Exeter services
| 
|- style="text-align:center;"
|162.4162.6
|261.4  261.7
| Start of motorway 
|rowspan=2| J31
| Bodmin, Okehampton A30
| 
|- style="text-align:center;"
|162.7
| 261.8
| Okehampton A30 (West), Exeter (A377)Non-motorway traffic
| End of motorway Road continues as A38 towards Plymouth, Torquay
|

Cultural references
M5#1 is a song from the 1994 album Middle Class Revolt by post-punk band The Fall which uses the M5 to describe reverting to a romanticised agricultural past that never really existed.

See also

 List of motorways in the United Kingdom

References

Notes

Sources

Further reading

External links

 Central Motorway Police Group
 CBRD Motorway Database – M5
 CBRD videos – M5
 Major roads of Great Britain – M5
 The Motorway Archive
 Junctions 1 to 2 and other Midlands motorways
 Junctions 3 to 8
 Junctions 3 to 8 widening
 Junctions 8 to 22
 Junctions 22 to 31

 
Motorways in England
Transport in Gloucestershire
Roads in Somerset
Transport in Staffordshire
Roads in the West Midlands (county)
Roads in Worcestershire
Transport in Exeter
Roads in Bristol
Roads in Devon